Park Jeong-Min  (born 25 October 1988) is a South Korean footballer currently playing for Yongin City in the National League, the third tier of South Korean football. He previously played for Gwangju FC.

External links 

1988 births
Living people
Association football forwards
Hannam University alumni
South Korean footballers
Gwangju FC players
K League 1 players